Michalopoulos is a surname. Notable people with the surname include:

 Andreas Michalopoulos (born 1949), Greek footballer
 Athanasios Michalopoulos (born 1973), Greek beach volleyball player
 George Michalopoulos, Greek-American pathologist
 Giannis Michalopoulos (1927–2016), Greek actor
 Ilias Michalopoulos (born 1985), Greek footballer
 Panos Michalopoulos (born 1949), Greek actor
 Tom Michalopoulos (1950–2021), Greek-born Canadian entrepreneur